Antonio Missaglia (1416/17–1495/96) was an Italian armourer.

Missaglia's last name was a nickname taken by the artist based on where he was born (Missaglia). The original family name was Negroni. Both Antonio and his brother Tommaso created armor by trade, primarily to nobles and knights in Milan. Some of Missaglia's pieces can be seen at the Kunsthistorisches Museum.

References

External links
 

1416 births
1495 deaths
Armourers
Medieval artisans
15th-century Italian businesspeople